Susanna "Susy" Raganelli is an Italian kart racing driver. She is known for being the 1966 Karting World Champion, and is the only female to have won a major four-wheel driving world championship.

In 1965 she won the karting Italian 100cc Super championship, and in 1966 helped her countrymen win the European Nation's Championship.

She also raced for Alfa Romeo, driving the Alfa Romeo GTA. She was the "first Italian buyer" of the Alfa Romeo 33 Stradale, of which only 12 were produced.

Raganelli is the daughter of Cesare Raganelli, an Alfa Romeo car dealer in Rome. She was married to fellow kart racer, and 1971 Italian Formula 3 champion, Giancarlo Naddeo.

References

External links
 

1946 births
Italian female racing drivers
Karting World Championship drivers
Racing drivers from Rome
Living people